Janardana is an epithet of Vishnu in the Puranas. Janardana means, “he who is the original abode and protector of all living beings”.

Literature 

In the Mahabharata, Sanjaya uses this epithet of Vishnu to describe the latter's prowess to King Dhritarashtra:

In the Bhagavad Gita, Arjuna invokes this epithet:

References

Titles and names of Krishna
Names of Vishnu